Major-General William Frederick Cleeve  (24 January 1853 – 31 January 1922) was a British Army officer who became Commandant of the Royal Military Academy, Woolwich.

Military career
Cleeve was commissioned into the Royal Artillery as a lieutenant on 29 April 1873. He served in Second Anglo-Afghan War (1878–80), was promoted to captain on 1 September 1882, to major on 12 February 1890, and to lieutenant-colonel on 3 January 1899. He was appointed Chief Instructor in Gunnery in 1901, and promoted to colonel on 3 January 1903. In 1914 he was appointed Commandant of the Royal Military Academy, Woolwich, holding that post throughout World War I.

Cleeve was appointed as a Companion of the Order of the Bath (CB) in 1916.

Family
In 1894, he married Gwladys Elizabeth Mitchell.

References

External links

1853 births
1922 deaths
British Army major generals
British Army generals of World War I
Commandants of the Royal Military Academy, Woolwich
Royal Artillery officers
Companions of the Order of the Bath
English justices of the peace